Latouche Island is an island in the southern part of Alaska, United States. It lies in the Gulf of Alaska between Montague Island to the east and Evans Island to the northwest. Latouche Island has a land area of 60.627 km2 (23.408 sq mi) and had no resident population at the 2000 census.

References
Latouche Island: Block 1057, Census Tract 3, Valdez-Cordova Census Area, Alaska United States Census Bureau

Islands of Alaska
Islands of Chugach Census Area, Alaska
Islands of Unorganized Borough, Alaska